Silva, is a surname in Portuguese-speaking countries.

Silva may also refer to:

Arts and entertainment
 Silva, a character in the operetta Die Csárdásfürstin
 Silva (film), a 1944 Soviet musical film based on the operetta
 , directed by Yan Frid 
 Silva, a Shaman King character
 Silva (Spanish strophe), a form of poetry
 Raoul Silva, a character played by Javier Bardem in the 2012 action film Skyfall.

Places 
 Silva (Barcelos), Portugal
 Silva e Águas Vivas, Miranda do Douro, Portugal, formerly the parishes of Silva and Águas Vivas
 São Julião e Silva, Valença, Portugal
 Silva, Missouri, U.S.
 Parish of Silva (Tongowoko County), New South Wales, Australia

Other uses
 Silva (footballer, born 1981), full name Kleber Rogério do Carmo Silva, Brazilian football midfielder
 Silva (footballer, born 1984), full name Weliander Silva Nascimento, Brazilian football midfielder
 Silva (footballer, born 1995), full name Adniellyson da Silva Oliveira, Brazilian football midfielder 
 Silva (given name), a Latvian and Armenian feminine given name
 Silva compass, outdoor navigational equipment by Silva Sweden AB 
 Silva International Investments, a London-based investment company
 SILVA ribosomal RNA database, in microbiology
 Silva SD, a Spanish football team

See also 

 Sylva (disambiguation)
 Silver (disambiguation)
 Silva Method, a self-help system developed by José Silva